HV71 Dam are a professional ice hockey club in the Swedish Women's Hockey League (SDHL). They play in Jönköping, in the southern Swedish province of Småland, at the Husqvarna Garden.

History 
The club was originally formed independently in March 2002 as Jönköpings IF Queens, after neither local men's SHL team HV71 nor Hockeyettan club HC Dalen were willing to start women's divisions. The club's logo was designed by 18-year old Swedish-Iranian refugee Behnaz Bahabozorgi, who would serve as the club's chairperson, the club holding practices on an outdoor rink on Saturdays. They began play in the 2003–04 Damettan season, finishing last in the southern division. In April 2008, as the team had grown to the point of adding a B-side and a youth side, the club decided to merge with the HV71 organisation, becoming the HV71 Queens from 1 August the same year.

In 2012, the club earned promotion to the SDHL for the first time. For their first top-division season, the club dropped the "Queens" from their name, playing only as HV71. They finished last place in the 2012–13 season, and were relegated back to Damettan. The club made it to the promotion playoffs in 2013–14, but lost. The following season, after the HV71 board decided to substantially increase investment into the women's side, more than doubling the club's budget and making big signings such as Jenni Asserholt and Fanny Rask, the team earned promotion back to the SDHL. In 2016–17, the club was able to reach the SDHL playoff finals, but lost against Djurgårdens IF.

In the 2019–20 SDHL season, HV71 finished on top of the league table for the first time in club history, setting a SDHL record for most regular season points with 99. They made the SDHL playoff finals for the second time in club history, but the playoffs were cancelled due to the COVID-19 pandemic in Sweden. Halfway through the season, head coach Lucas Frey had to retire after an accident in practice left him with severely impaired eyesight, being replaced by Djurgårdens IF assistant coach Joakim Engström.

Season-by-season results 
This is a partial list of the most recent seasons completed by HV71. Code explanation: GP—Games played, W—Wins, OTW—Overtime wins, T—Overtime losses, L—Losses, GF—Goals for, GA—Goals against, Pts—Points. Top Scorer: Points (Goals+Assists)

Players and personnel

2022–23 roster 

Coaching staff and team personnel
 Head coach: Peter Hammarström
 Assistant coach: Axel Nyberg
 Goaltending coach: Emil Karnatz
 Equipment manager: Dan Eriksson

Team captains 
 Jenni Asserholt, 2015–2017
 Riikka Sallinen, 2017–2019
 Jessica Healey, 2019–20
 Sidney Morin, 2020–21
 Hanna Olsson, 2021–22
 Sanni Hakala, 2022–

Head coaches 
 Tony Almsgård, 2002–2010 
 Ulf Johansson, 2013–2018
 Lucas Frey, 2018–19
 Joakim Engström, 2019–2022
 Peter Hammarström, 2022–

Franchise records and leaders

All-time scoring leaders 
The top-ten point scorers (goals + assists) of HV71 through the 2021–22 season.

Note: Nat = Nationality; Pos = Position; GP = Games played; G = Goals; A = Assists; Pts = Points; P/G = Points per game;  = 2022–23 HV71 player

References

External links 
 
 Team information and statistics from Eliteprospects.com and Eurohockey.com

HV71
Swedish Women's Hockey League teams
Ice hockey teams in Sweden
Sport in Jönköping
Ice hockey teams in Jönköping County
Women's ice hockey teams in Europe
Women's ice hockey in Sweden